King Hill is a mountain in Greene County, New York. It is located in the Catskill Mountains east of Greenville Center. Murder Bridge Hill is located north-northwest of King Hill.

References

Mountains of Greene County, New York
Mountains of New York (state)